Rhinelepis is a genus of South American armored catfish.

Species
There are currently two recognized species in this genus:
 Rhinelepis aspera Spix & Agassiz, 1829
 Rhinelepis strigosa Valenciennes, 1840

Appearance and anatomy
Rhinelepis species are large and heavily plated, though the plates on the abdomen (belly) develop later than in Pseudorinelepis. They are generally charcoal gray without any markings. The head is long and fat. The fins are short and the adipose fin is entirely absent. The gill opening is much larger than that of most loricariids. The cheeks lack elongate odontodes.

References

Hypostominae
Fish of South America
Catfish genera
Taxa named by Louis Agassiz